Claude Wagner  (April 4, 1925 – July 11, 1979) was a Canadian judge and politician in the province of Quebec, Canada. Throughout his career, he was a Crown prosecutor, professor of criminal law and judge.

Life and career
Wagner was born in Shawinigan, Quebec, as the son of Corona ( Saint-Arnaud) and Benjamin Wagner. His father, a violinist, was a immigrant from the city of Sucheva Bukovina Romania. His mother was French-Canadian.

In 1963, Wagner was appointed as a Sessions Court judge. Subsequently, he was elected to the Legislative Assembly of Quebec in a by-election in Montréal-Verdun on October 5, 1964, and was re-elected in the 1966 general election in Verdun. He earned a "law-and-order" reputation when he served successively as Solicitor General, Attorney General, and Minister of Justice from its creation in 1965 to 1966 in the government of Quebec Premier Jean Lesage.

After losing the 1970 Quebec Liberal Party leadership election to Robert Bourassa, Wagner left electoral politics to return to the bench, receiving appointment once more as a Sessions Court judge. He then entered federal politics, and was elected as the Progressive Conservative Member of Parliament for Saint-Hyacinthe in the 1972 federal election, serving in the 29th Parliament as an Opposition MP. He was re-elected in the 1974 election, and after Robert Stanfield resigned as leader of the party, he stood as a candidate at the Progressive Conservative leadership convention of 1976.

Wagner attracted support from Tories who believed that having a leader from Quebec would enable the party to break the federal Liberal Party's stranglehold on the province and from right-wing Tories attracted by his law-and-order reputation. He was hurt by revelations of a slush fund that was funded by supporters so that he would be financially solvent if he lost in 1972. Wagner led on the first three ballots of the convention, but Joe Clark won the leadership by 65 votes out of 2,309 on the fourth ballot.

In 1978, he was nominated to the Senate of Canada by Prime Minister Pierre Trudeau; he accepted the appointment and sat as a Progressive Conservative. One reason for his departure from the House of Commons was that he could not get along well with Clark. He died of cancer the next year at the age of 54, during Clark's brief premiership.

His son, Richard, also pursued a career in the judiciary, eventually being nominated to sit on the Supreme Court of Canada in 2012 by Prime Minister Stephen Harper, and who became Chief Justice of Canada in 2017 during the government of Justin Trudeau. On January 21, 2021, Richard Wagner assumed the role of Administrator of Canada, following a workplace review of Rideau Hall and the resignation of Julie Payette as Governor General of Canada, pending the appointment of a new Governor General.

See also
 Quebec federalism
 List of Mauriciens

References

External links
 
 

1925 births
1979 deaths
Judges in Quebec
Canadian senators from Quebec
Justice ministers of Quebec
Lawyers in Quebec
Members of the House of Commons of Canada from Quebec
Members of the King's Privy Council for Canada
People from Shawinigan
Progressive Conservative Party of Canada MPs
Progressive Conservative Party of Canada senators
Quebec Liberal Party MNAs
University of Ottawa alumni
20th-century Canadian lawyers
Canadian King's Counsel
Canadian people of German-Jewish descent
French Quebecers
Progressive Conservative Party of Canada leadership candidates
Deaths from cancer in Canada